Scott Robert Pye (born 8 January 1990) is an Australian professional racing driver. He currently competes in the Repco Supercars Championship, and drives the No. 20 Holden ZB Commodore for Team 18.

Racing career

Early days
Pye started out in go-karts, winning six state championships. Pye moved up to the Formula Ford level in 2007 when he raced in the State Series Formula Ford in Australia for Borland Racing Developments/ Cams Rising Star.

2008 saw Pye move up to the Australian Formula Ford Championship, again with Borland Racing Developments/ Cams Rising Star. He finished the championship in seventh place in 2008 and in third position in 2009.

International foray
Pye joined fellow Australian driver Nathan Antunes in the European Technique team for the 2008–09 Toyota Racing Series in New Zealand. He achieved a podium finish in his first race at Ruapuna and completed the weekend with a win in the third race which saw him take home the Wigram Cup. Pye continued his good form in round two at Timaru International Motor Raceway when he won the final two races, earning him the round win.

For 2010 Pye moved to the United Kingdom to compete in the British Formula Ford Championship. Racing a Mygale for British team Jamun Racing, he won the championship with 12 race wins and 17 pole positions. He also finished second in the Formula Ford Festival in 2010.

Pye competed in the British Formula 3 Championship for 2011 with Double R. Pye's Mercedes-engined CampingF1 sponsored Dallara lapped the 2.7-mile Oulton Park International Circuit in 1m 27.621s, more than a second inside the 2010 pole position time set by eventual champion Jean-Éric Vergne. He finished tenth in the championship with one win at Rockingham and a second place at the season-ending Silverstone weekend.

Return to Australia

Development Series
In February 2012, Pye returned to Australia and made the switch to touring cars, becoming the new driver of Triple Eight Race Engineering's championship-winning Monster Energy/GearWrench backed Holden VE Commodore in the 2012 V8 Supercar Development Series. Pye finished the championship in second place behind Scott McLaughlin.

Lucas Dumbrell Motorsport

In 2013 he graduated to the International V8 Supercars Championship. driving for Lucas Dumbrell Motorsport in a Holden VF Commodore with sponsorship from Ekol and Hog's Breath Cafe. Pye endured a difficult season, including a heavy crash at Symmons Plains Raceway that caused him to miss the Pukekohe round due to the lack of a spare car.

Dick Johnson Racing/DJR Team Penske

After one season at Lucas Dumbrell Motorsport, Pye signed a two-year deal with Dick Johnson Racing, driving a Ford FG Falcon with Wilson Security sponsorship for 2014. However, in September 2014, Team Penske bought a stake in the team and eventually elected to run only a single entry in 2015 for two-time champion Marcos Ambrose, in his return from NASCAR. Pye signed on as Enduro Cup team-mate to Ambrose at the renamed DJR Team Penske, but after mixed performances at the Adelaide 500 and the non-championship Supercars Challenge, Ambrose stepped down from the seat, leaving Pye back in a full-time drive for the remainder of the season.

With the team signing Fabian Coulthard for 2016, Pye once again faced an uncertain future before the team elected to expand to two cars. Following this confirmation, Pye went on to score his first championship podium at the ITM 500 Auckland. In 2016, Pye scored two more podiums, at Phillip Island and another at Pukekohe on the way to a career-best top 15 championship result. Despite this, he was once again out of a drive for 2017, with his former Development Series rival McLaughlin being signed for DJR Team Penske to join Coulthard.

Walkinshaw Racing/Walkinshaw Andretti United

In September 2016, Pye was announced as the replacement for Garth Tander at Walkinshaw Racing for 2017, the team's first season since losing the Holden Racing Team moniker. In a difficult season for the team, Pye finished 12th in the standings, ahead of team-mate James Courtney, with the highlight for Pye being a second place at the 2017 Supercheap Auto Bathurst 1000 driving with Warren Luff. Just as happened while Pye was at Dick Johnson Racing, the team was bought out by international interests during his first season at the team, with Andretti Autosport and United Autosports each taking part-ownership in the team which became known as Walkinshaw Andretti United. Pye did retain his seat into 2018 and took his first championship race win in dramatic circumstances at the second event, the Melbourne 400 on the Albert Park Grand Prix Circuit. Pye had led the race comfortably until a late-race shower brought Jamie Whincup back into contention in the final laps. On 7 October Pye, driving with Warren Luff, went back-to-back with second-place finishes at the Supercheap Auto Bathurst 1000 and later he finished 7th at Newcastle and in the points standings. 
On 6 November 2019 he announced he will be leaving Walkinshaw Andretti United.

Team 18
On 7 November 2019 he announced that he would be joining Team 18 for the 2020 season.

Career results

Supercars Championship results

Complete Bathurst 1000 results

Complete Bathurst 12 Hour results

References

External links
 Toyota Racing Series – toyotaracing.co.nz

Profile at Racing Reference

1990 births
British Formula Three Championship drivers
Formula Ford drivers
Living people
Racing drivers from South Australia
Toyota Racing Series drivers
Supercars Championship drivers
Team Penske drivers
Andretti Autosport drivers
United Autosports drivers
Dick Johnson Racing drivers
Double R Racing drivers